Marjorie Mountain was an Australian tennis player.

Grand slam finals

Marjorie Mountain reached the final in women's doubles in the inaugural Australian Championship 1922 with Esna Boyd and they defeated Gwen Utz and Floris St. George  1–6, 6–4, 7–5 to win the title. She also she reached semifinals of the Australian Open in the Mixed doubles with Roy Wertheim in the same year

References

Australasian Championships (tennis) champions
Australian Championships (tennis) champions
Australian female tennis players
Grand Slam (tennis) champions in women's doubles
Year of birth missing
Year of death missing
Place of birth missing